The Trisk dynasty is a Volyn (then in the Russian Empire, today Ukraine) Hasidic dynasty, a branch of the Chernobyl dynasty, originating in Turiisk, Ukraine. The rebbes of the court also served in Poland, before the Second World War it was a large court of some 20,000 Hasidim (followers).

Today there are several descendants of the lineage, but they have no real court.

First generation 
The first rebbe of Trisk was Grand Rabbi Avraham Twersky (born 1806, died July 1, 1889, in Turisk), son of Grand Rabbi Mordechai Twersky of Chernobyl.

Post Holocaust 
Grand Rabbi Menachem Mendel Matisyohu Twersky is known as the Trisker Rebbe of London.

Lineage
Grand Rabbi Menachem Nuchem Twersky (born June 23, 1829, died 1887 at Brisk), eldest son of Grand Rabbi Avraham.
Grand Rabbi Mordechai Zishe Twersky of Trisk-Iasi (died March 18, 1932, in Romania), eldest son of Rabbi Menachem Nuchem
Grand Rabbi Shulem Yoseph Twersky (born 1883 at Turisk, died February 8, 1945, in New York City), son of Rabbi Mordechai Zishe
Grand Rabbi Sroyahu Yonah Twersky, grandson of Rabbi Shulem Yoseph.
Grand Rabbi David Twersky of Buhusi (born 1884 at Turisk, died December 9, 1933, in Iasi), son of Rabbi Mordechai Zishe and son-in-law of Rabbi Yisroel Sholom Yosef Friedman of Bohush
Grand Rabbi Yakov Leib Twersky (born 1885 at Turisk, died October 12, 1979, in Bnei Brak, Israel), son of Rabbi Mordechai Zishe
Grand Rabbi Chaim Menachem Avrohom Twersky (born February 27, 1915, at Zinkov, died December 1, 2010, at Hackney, London), son of Rabbi Yakov Leib
Grand Rabbi Mordechai Zisye Twersky, son of Rabbi Chaim Menachem Avrohom
Grand Rabbi Pinchos Twersky of Trisk-London (born May 17, 1916, at Zinkov, died August 12, 2001, at London), son of Rabbi Yakov Leib
Grand Rabbi Menachem Mendel Matisyohu Twersky of London (born December 9, 1946, at London), son of Rabbi Pinchos
Grand Rabbi Yitzchok Duvid Twersky of Trisk-Tolna. Son of Rabbi Menachem Mendel Matisyohu

Grand Rabbi Moishe Yide Leib Twersky of Chelem (born 1873 at Tolna, died 1938 at Warsaw, Poland), second son of Rabbi Menachem Nuchem
Grand Rabbi Mordche Twersky of Kozmir (born 1840, died June 20, 1915, at Kielce), second son of Grand Rabbi Avraham.
Grand Rabbi Yaakov Aryeh Leib Twersky of Trisk-Hrubieszow (born 1847 at Turisk, died May 10, 1918, in Gmina Hrubieszów, Lublin), third son of Grand Rabbi Avraham.
Grand Rabbi Moshe Mordechei Twersky (born 1877 at Turisk, perished May 13, 1943, at Bełżec extermination camp), son of Rabbi Yaakov Aryeh Leib
Grand Rabbi Moshe Mordechai Eichenstein, Trisker Rebbe of Yerushalayim, The great-grandson of Grand Rabbi Moshe Mordechai of Trisk.

References

Hasidic dynasties